Sypnoides pannosa is a species of moth of the family Erebidae first described by Frederic Moore in 1882. It is found in India, the Himalayas, Borneo, Sumatra, Thailand and Taiwan.

References

Moths described in 1882
Calpinae